The 2008 Russian Professional Rugby League Season was the fourth season of the new Russian Professional Rugby League.  The season saw a huge expansion of the competition with the entrance of 14 teams into the preliminary group stage of the championship. VVA Monino were the eventual champions.

Format

This season saw the introduction of an initial group stage whereby the championship was divided into two Divisions, the Eastern Division consisting of six teams, and the Western Division consisting of eight, with the West Division further subdivided into two groups of four.  At the end of the group stage the top six sides formed a super-group that then featured a home and away stage between these six sides.

The play-offs again featured a best of three semi final stage with the top side playing against the four side, whilst two versed three.  The final itself was a best of three if required, though the surprise finalists Slava Moscow were defeated by VVA Monino 2-0.

Teams

Stage One East Divisions

Round One

Round Two

Round 3

Stage One West Division (Group A)

Round One

Round Two

Stage One West Division (Group B)

Round One

Round Two

Superleague (Final League) Table (Places 1-6)

Play-offs

2007
2008 in Russian rugby union
2008 rugby union tournaments for clubs
2007–08 in European rugby union leagues
2008–09 in European rugby union leagues